Muhadow or Muhadov or  Mukhatov (f. Muhadowa or Muhadova) is a Russianized Turkmen family name.

Muhadow may refer to:
 Veli Mukhatov (b. 1916), Soviet and Turkmen composer
 Çariýar Muhadow (b. 1969), Turkmen football player
 Azat Muhadow (b. 1981), Turkmen football player
 Süleýman Muhadow (b. 1993), Turkmen football player

Russian-language surnames
Turkmen-language surnames